KRI Ki Hajar Dewantara (364) is a Dewantara-class training corvette of Indonesian Navy that was built in SFR Yugoslavia. The ship was built in 1980 and was decommissioned in 2019. She is planned to be preserved as museum ship.

Design and description
She was also equipped with controllable pitch propeller.

The ship has a complement of 89 personnel, with the addition of 14 instructors and 100 cadets for training purpose. She was armed with two MM38 Exocet missile launchers with 4 missiles, one Bofors 57 mm L/70 Mk 1 naval gun, and two 20 mm Rheinmetall Mk 20 Rh-202 autocannons in single mount. Later in her service, the Navy mounted Mistral surface-to-air missile to bolster the ship's air defense. The ship also armed with two  torpedo tubes for SUT torpedoes, a GM 101/41 depth charge projector, and two twin-tubed 128 mm flare launchers. Ki Hajar Dewantara has helipad in her stern and able to carry a helicopter. She also able to carry two LCVPs. As a training ship, she has classroom and additional bridge, navigation room, radio room, and accommodations.

Construction and career
The ship was ordered on 14 March 1978 to Split Shipyard, SFR Yugoslavia. Her keel was laid down on 11 May 1979 and she was launched on 11 October 1980. She was initially named as KRI Hadjar Dewantoro. She arrived in Indonesia in the autumn of 1981 and was commissioned on 31 October 1981.

In 1992, KRI Ki Hajar Dewantara, along with KRI Yos Sudarso and KRI Teluk Banten intercepted Portuguese ship Lusitania Expresso in East Timor. Col. Widodo, deputy assistant of the Indonesian Navy's Eastern Fleet, told Radio Republik Indonesia from aboard the Indonesian warship KRI Yos Sudarso that the ferry entered Indonesian waters at 5:28 in the morning of 11 March 1992. At 6:07, Lusitania Expresso had traveled  into Indonesian territory and Captain Luis Dos Santos (Lusitania Expressos captain) was ordered to leave immediately. Col. Widodo said the Portuguese ship's captain obeyed the order and turned his ship around and headed back to sea.

The ship was out of service since mid 2017. Before being decommissioned, her 57 mm gun was dismounted to be reused for naval gunnery training at naval weapons range in Paiton, Probolinggo Regency, East Java. On 16 August 2019, Ki Hajar Dewantara along with KRI Slamet Riyadi, KRI Teluk Penyu, and three other Navy ships were decommissioned in a ceremony at 2nd Fleet Command HQ in Surabaya. Surabaya municipal government planned to utilized her as maritime museum with restaurant and coffeehouse. She is planned to be placed at Kenjeran Beach.

See also
 List of former ships of the Indonesian Navy

Notes

Reference

Bibliography
 
 

1980 ships
Corvettes of the Indonesian Navy
Training ships of the Indonesian Navy
Ships built in Yugoslavia